Nicholas Fandorin is the protagonist of four novels by Boris Akunin, subtitled  ("Adventures of the magister [viz., the MA])". He is the grandson of Akunin's other fictional character Erast Fandorin.

The uniting concept of the series is that each novel combines two storylines, one set in present-day Russia (in 1995 to 2005), and a related one set in the Russian Empire (in the 1670s, 1790s, and 1860s).
2001: Altyn Tolobas  (1995, 1675–76), 
2003: Extracurricular Reading  (2001, 1795), 
2006: F.M.  (2006, 1865), 
2009: The Falcon and the Swallow  (2009, 1702)

Altyn Tolobas
Nicholas is the grandson of Erast Fandorin, born in ca. 1960. His father was Alexander Fandorin (1920–1994), born in British exile where his pregnant mother had fled from the Russian Civil War. Nicholas has a master's degree in history, specializing in the 19th century history of the Russian Empire, and (in Altyn Tolobas) visits the land of his ancestors for the first time in 1995, after the fall of the Soviet Union, tracing the founder of the Russian Fandorins, a Swabian musketeer Cornelius von Dorn who took service with the Tsar in 1675, and died in the 1682 Moscow uprising, nine generations removed from Nicholas.

Extracurricular Reading
Extracurricular Reading is set in 2001, six years after the events of the preceding novel. Nicholas is now married to and has two children with Altyn Mamaeva, whom he met in 1995. He has abandoned his British citizenship for a Russian passport.

As in the preceding novel, Nicholas' current-day adventures are told in parallel with the story of one of his ancestors, in this case Daniel Vondorin   Mithridates Karpov (Samson Vondorin), the 4th and 5th Fandorins after Cornelius, set in the final year of the reign (and life) of Catherine the Great.
The connecting theme of the two stories surrounds the responsibilities of fatherhood. Nicholas Fandorin is involved in a series of crimes in which his children, and the child of one of the involved New Russian businessmen, are threatened; Mithridates is a child prodigy whose father has aspirations at court, but the boy becomes aware of a plot against the empress' life and has to escape.

Each chapter of the novel is titled after, and contains some literary allusion to, a classic of Russian or world literature.

F.M.

In F.M., Nicholas seeks a lost manuscript of (F.M.) Dostoevsky's Crime and Punishment. The 19th-century story is told from the point of view of Porfiry Petrovich, the detective in Dostoevsky's novel, set in the  decade predating the setting of the first Erast Fandorin novel.

The Falcon and the Swallow
Nicholas Fandorin, at the height of the financial crisis of 2009, travels on the Atlantic in the luxury cruise liner Falcon.
The Swallow, meanwhile, is a light frigate which travelled the same waters in the year 1702.
Nicholas has received from his British aunt Cynthia a manuscript by the hand of one Appin, which he finds out is really Laetitia von Dorn, a niece of captain Cornelius von Dorn, which turns out to lead to a hidden treasure. Laetitia in 1702, disguised as a man, is in search of the same, then-recently hidden, treasure.

External links
official site
 (e-text)
 (e-text)

Fictional historians
Novels by Boris Akunin
Novel sequences
Characters in Russian novels of the 21st century
Fictional Russian people in literature